Johnny Dixon is a fictional American boy featured in a series of twelve children's gothic horror novels, 1983 to 1999, written by John Bellairs or his successor Brad Strickland. In each book, 12-year-old Johnny and his group of friends face and overcome evil forces usually bent on ending the world. Alternatively, Johnny Dixon is the book series ("Johnny Dixon and the Professor" in ISFDB).

The series is set in the early 1950s. Johnny lives with his paternal grandparents in fictional Duston Heights, Massachusetts; his mother died of cancer some time prior to the beginning of the series, and his father is a fighter pilot in the United States Air Force during the Korean War. Johnny's best friend, history professor Roderick Childermass, lives across the street. In "The Mummy, the Will and the Crypt", Johnny meets a boy his own age, Byron Q. "Fergie" Ferguson, at a Boy Scout camp. Thenceforth, Johnny, Fergie, and Professor Childermass (who is typically referred to as simply "the professor") are the three principal characters of the series.

Series bibliography

  One Johnny Dixon book was outlined by Bellairs and completed by Strickland.

See also

Lewis Barnavelt (series)
Anthony Monday (series)

References 

Johnny Dixon
Johnny Dixon
Literary characters introduced in 1983
Child characters in literature
Characters in children's literature
Characters in American novels of the 20th century